Typhochlaena is a genus of small-bodied tarantulas with an arboreal trapdoor lifestyle. All the species except for T. seladonia were first described by Rogério Bertani in 2012.

Characteristics 
Typhochlaena differs from all other aviculariine species by having a domed, short distal segment on the posterior lateral spinneret; the sternum is as long as wide, truncated behind; they are also quite small, with type II urticating hairs.

Species 
, the World Spider Catalog accepted the following species:

Typhochlaena amma Bertani, 2012 – Brazil
Typhochlaena costae Bertani, 2012 – Brazil
Typhochlaena curumim Bertani, 2012 – Brazil
Typhochlaena paschoali Bertani, 2012 – Brazil
Typhochlaena seladonia (C.L. Koch, 1841) (type species) – Brazil

References 

Theraphosidae
Spiders of Brazil
Theraphosidae genera